Keynan Parker (born November 17, 1990) is a professional Canadian football defensive back for the BC Lions of the Canadian Football League (CFL). He was drafted 42nd overall in the 2012 CFL Draft by the Montreal Alouettes and signed with the club on May 17, 2013. Parker was part of the final cuts following the Alouettes' training camp and signed with the Lions on June 25, 2013. He signed a two-year contract extension on January 4, 2017, keeping him signed with the Lions through the 2018 season. He played college football with the Oregon State Beavers and Simon Fraser Clan.

During his amateur playing days, Keynan was also an accomplished track and field athlete and often distinguished himself as one of the fastest players on his team.  In 2007, he set the Canadian youth record in the 200 meter sprint (21.44 seconds) at the Royal Canadian Legion Nationals before placing fifth at the World Youth Track and Field Championships in the 100 meter dash with a time of 10.61 in that same year.

Keynan's father, James "Quick" Parker, is a member of the Canadian Football Hall of Fame.

References

External links
BC Lions bio 

1990 births
Living people
BC Lions players
Canadian football defensive backs
Oregon State Beavers football players
Players of Canadian football from British Columbia
Simon Fraser Clan football players
Canadian football people from Vancouver